Sam Nujoma Street is one of the main streets of Harare, Zimbabwe. It was originally called Second Street but was renamed to Sam Nujoma Street to honor Sam Nujoma, the first President of neighboring Namibia. It also is connected to the main park in Harare which is opposite the Cathedral of St Mary and All Saints.

Roads in Zimbabwe
Harare